The men's 90 kg competition of the judo events at the 2011 Pan American Games in Guadalajara, Mexico, was held on October 27 at the CODE II Gymanasium.  The defending champion was Tiago Camilo of Brazil.

Schedule
All times are Central Standard Time (UTC-6).

Results
Legend

1st number = Ippon
2nd number = Waza-ari
3rd number = Yuko

Bracket

Repechage round
Two bronze medals were awarded.

References

M90
Judo at the Pan American Games Men's Middleweight